Patania agilis is a moth in the family Crambidae. It was described by Edward Meyrick in 1936. It is found in the Democratic Republic of the Congo (Orientale, North Kivu, Katanga, Equateur).

References

Moths described in 1936
Moths of Africa
Spilomelinae
Taxa named by Edward Meyrick